is a village located in Fukushima Prefecture, Japan. , the village had an estimated population of 5,258 in 1717 households, and a population density of 23 persons per km2.

Geography
Ten-ei is located in south-central Fukushima prefecture. The village spans the Pacific side of the Abukuma River watershed and the Sea of Japan side of the Agano River watershed across the Ou Mountains. Hatori Dam is located in the village, which supplies agricultural water to the Shirakawa area of the Abukuma River basin and golf courses, campgrounds, skiing around the reservoir. There are many of traditional hot springs in the village.

 Mountains: Futamatayama (1544 m)
 Rivers: Shakado River, Tsurunuma River

Neighboring municipalities
 Fukushima Prefecture
 Kōriyama
Sukagawa
Aizuwakamatsu
 Shimogō
 Kagamiishi
 Yabuki
Shirakawa
 Nishigō

Climate
Ten-ei has a humid climate (Köppen climate classification Cfa).

Demographics
Per Japanese census data, the population of Ten-ei has declined over the past 70 years.

History
The area of present-day Ten-ei was part of ancient Mutsu Province and formed part of the holdings of Shirakawa Domain during the Edo period. After the Meiji Restoration, it was organized as part of Iwase District in the Nakadōri region of Iwashiro Province. The villages of  Makimoto, Yumoto, Oya and Hiroto were established on April 1, 1889, with the creation of the modern municipalities system. The village of Ten-ei was formed on March 31, 1955, with the merger of the villages of Makimoto, Yumoto, and a portion of Hiroto with the village of Osato. Many of the houses in the village suffered severe damage from the 2011 Tohoku earthquake.

Economy
The economy of Ten’ei is primarily agricultural, with Yacón a noteworthy crop.

Education
Ten-ei has four public elementary schools and two public middle schools operated by the village government. The village does not have a high school.
 Ten-ei Middle School
 Yumoto Middle School

Transportation

Railway
 Ten-ei does not have any passenger railway service.

Highway

Local attractions
 Hatori Dam 
 Futamata Hot Spring
 Yumoto Hot Spring
 Ten’ei Hot Spring
 Hatoriko Hot Spring and ski resort

References

External links

 

 
Villages in Fukushima Prefecture